Ricky Cockerill (born 26 October 1978) is a New Zealand former competitive figure skater. He is a seven-time New Zealand national champion and competed in the free skate at five Four Continents Championships.

Life and career 
Cockerill was born on 26 October 1978 in Dunedin, New Zealand, and was educated at Otago Boys' High School.

Cockerill trained as a figure skater in Auckland, New Zealand; Sydney, Australia; and Moscow, Russia. He represented New Zealand in a number of international competitions including three world championships and five Four Continents Championships. He is the first, and to this day the only New Zealand figure skater to complete all triple jumps as well as triple-triple combinations.

After retiring from sport in 2005, Cockerill completed an economics degree at Auckland University of Technology and moved to London to pursue a career in finance. There he began his career with Barclays Bank PLC and worked for three years in the corporate banking division at Barclays' head office in Canary Wharf. In 2010, he moved to Moscow to work for Barclays Russia.

Cockerill moved back to New Zealand in 2014 together with his wife. He now works as a business broker in Dunedin and helps his wife to run a new dance studio. He is a happy father of 2 girls.

Sporting results

References

External links
 

New Zealand figure skaters
1978 births
Living people
Sportspeople from Dunedin
New Zealand sportsmen
People educated at Otago Boys' High School
20th-century New Zealand people
21st-century New Zealand people